Alicia Mancilla (born 28 November 1999) is a Guatemalan swimmer. She competed in the women's 1500 metre freestyle event at the 2017 World Aquatics Championships. She attended Gulliver Prep in Miami, Florida during her high school years.

References

1999 births
Living people
Guatemalan female swimmers
Place of birth missing (living people)
Guatemalan female freestyle swimmers